The following is a list of Bureau of Indian Education and Tribally Controlled Schools in Arizona (including networks of such schools) grouped by county.

Apache County

Cottonwood Day School
Cove Day School
Kin Dah Lichi'i Olta
Lukachukai Community School
Many Farms Community School (formerly Chinle Boarding School)
Many Farms High School
Nazlini Community School
Red Rock Day School
Rock Point Community School
Rough Rock Community School
T'iis Nazbas Community Schools
Wide Ruins Community School

Coconino County

Greyhills Academy High School
Havasupai Elementary School
Leupp Schools, Inc. (Leupp, Tolani Lake)
Moencopi Day School 
NaaTsis'Aan Community School 
Tonalea Day School

Maricopa County
Salt River High School

Navajo County

Black Mesa Community School  
Chilchinbeto Community School
Dilcon Community School 
Dishchii'bikoh Community School 
First Mesa Elementary School 
Greasewood Springs Community School 
Hopi Day School 
Hotevilla Bacavi Community School
Jeehdeez'a Elementary School
John F. Kennedy Day School
Keams Canyon Elementary School
Leupp Schools, Inc. (Birdsprings)
Little Singer Community School
Pinon Community School
Second Mesa Day School
Shonto Preparatory School

Pima County
Santa Rosa Ranch School

Pinal County

Blackwater Community School-Akimel O'otham Pee Posh Charter School
Casa Blanca Community School

References

Indigenous